Eleonora Vargas is an Italian film actress.

She played Prisca in Gladiator of Rome (1962), and Horpina in Invasion 1700 (1962). She appeared in Il terrore dei barbari, The Hanging Woman (1972), by José Luis Merino, and Dinamite Jack (1960), by Jean Bastia and starring Fernandel and Adrienne Corri.

Filmography

References

External links
 
 

Italian film actresses
20th-century Italian actresses
Actresses from Rome
Year of birth missing
Date of birth unknown
Possibly living people